Ljube Boškoski (born 24 October 1960 in Čelopek, Brvenica Municipality, SR Macedonia, now North Macedonia), known among his supporters as "Brother Ljube", is a Macedonian politician and former Minister of Internal Affairs of North Macedonia.

He supervised an elite special operations tactical unit of the Macedonian police in his capacity as Minister of Internal Affairs. Boškoski would later be accused of "superior responsibility" by the ICTY for alleged war crimes, but was acquitted of all charges. Upon his return to Macedonia, Boškoski and his backers split from VMRO–DPMNE to form United for Macedonia which was considered a serious contender in the 2011 parliamentary election, but did not win any seats in the parliament.

On 6 June 2011, one day after the election, he was arrested by the police, and detained by the court for alleged illegal funding of the election campaign. Currently he is in prison, serving a seven-year sentence for illegal campaign funding and abuse of office during the 2011 election campaign of his party.

Boskovski is also in the United States black list, held by the Office of Foreign Assets Control for "engaging in, or assisting, sponsoring, or supporting extremist violence in the Republic of Macedonia and elsewhere in the Western Balkans region".

Biography
Boškoski was born on 24 October 1960, in the village of Čelopek, Brvenica municipality, on the outskirts of Tetovo. In 1985, he graduated from the Faculty of Law at the Ss. Cyril and Methodius University in Skopje, thereafter working as an apprentice in a court and later as a legal adviser for a health insurance fund in Rovinj, Croatia.

Raštanski Lozja Incident

On 2 March 2002, at approximately 4:00 a.m. local time (UTC+1 GMT), six Pakistani citizens and an Indian citizen were shot dead in Raštanski Lozja near the village of Ljuboten, close to the Macedonian border with Kosovo. It was alleged that the men were armed. They were shot by the Lions, an elite special operations tactical unit formed during the 2001 Macedonia conflict to aid against acts of terrorism and for emergency deployment in rural combat areas.

Macedonian officials were accused of killing the men as an act of further enhancing their status in the War on Terror which the Macedonian government supports. It was alleged that the men were killed "to impress the US". The Macedonian police spokeswoman Mirjana Konteska said the killings were "an act of a sick mind" and that they had "lost their lives in a staged murder."

Boškoski made a statement suggesting that the men were associated with a terrorist group and had planned attacks on the British, American and German embassies in the Macedonian capital of Skopje.

Boškoski was charged with a superior responsibility for the criminal acts of his subordinates. It is alleged that he knew or should have known that the crimes had been committed by his subordinates during the attack on the Albanian village of Ljuboten on 12 August 2001 but did nothing to punish the perpetrators.

Boškoski was indicted with Johan Tarčulovski. He faces charges on the basis of individual criminal responsibility with violations of the laws or customs of war including murder, wanton, destruction of cities, towns or villages and cruel treatment. The trials of Boškoski and Johan Tarčulovski started on 16 April 2007 and closing arguments took place on 6 and 8 May 2008. Boškoski pleaded not guilty to all the charges. On 10 July 2008, Trial Chamber II found Boškoski not guilty of all charges.

On 6 August 2008, the Prosecutor filed its Notice of Appeal against the Trial judgement of July 2008. On 19 May 2010 the Appeals Chamber delivered its judgement in the appeal of Tarčulovski  and Boškoski. The Appeals Chamber found that it was not shown that Boškoski had failed to take the necessary and reasonable measures to punish his offending subordinates. The Chamber stated that, in the circumstances of the case, it was open to a reasonable trier of fact to acquit Boškoski of failure to punish, on the basis of reports about the events described in the indictment which had been provided by the Ministry of Interior to the competent judicial authorities. The Appeals Chamber dismissed the Prosecution's single ground of appeal against Boškoski’s acquittal.

Trial and aftermath
Boškoski was detained in Croatia in August, 2004, after he was stripped of parliamentary immunity by North Macedonia. In December of that year, the International Criminal Tribunal for the former Yugoslavia (ICTY) published an indictment against him and Johan Tarčulovski.

In March, 2005, he was transferred to the ICTY in The Hague. Boškoski and Tarčulovski were charged with violations of the laws or customs of war during the 2001 Macedonia conflict — a "civil war" between ethnic Albanian members of the NLA and the Macedonian security forces such as the Wolves in 2001, during which, Boškoski was Minister of Internal Affairs.

According to the indictment, between Friday 10 August 2001, and Sunday 12 August 2001, a land offensive was launched by Macedonian security forces against ethnic Albanian civilians and property in Ljuboten, a predominantly Albanian village.

According to the tribunal, Boškoski, in his capacity as Minister of the Interior, "had de jure and de facto command and control over the members of the police forces which took part in the alleged crimes." The tribunal also claims that "Boškoski knew or had reason to know that the crimes alleged in this indictment had been committed by his subordinates."

The ICTY trial against Boškoski started on 16 April 2007, and ended on 10 July 2008, he was acquitted of all charges against him. However, Tarčulovski received 12 years imprisonment.

When Boškoski arrived at Skopje Alexander the Great Airport on 11 July 2008, he symbolically kissed the ground and was welcomed by women in traditional Macedonian clothes, and by the prime minister Nikola Gruevski. With tears in his eyes, he held a short speech in which he called for brotherhood among the people living in North Macedonia. Later that day, he appeared at Pella Square in Skopje and was welcomed by Macedonians who travelled from all over the country to the capital city.

Political career
After the parliamentary elections in 1998 and the success of VMRO-DPMNE, Boškoski was named deputy-director of the Directorate for Security and CounterIntelligence — the domestic intelligence agency of the Macedonian government.

On 31 January 2001, he was named state secretary of the Ministry of Internal Affairs, and on May 15, of the same year, appointed Minister of Internal Affairs by the ruling government. Following the parliamentary election of 15 September 2002, he was dismissed from his position as Minister of Internal Affairs and became a Member of Parliament.

In April, 2004, Boškoski nominated to run in the presidential elections and had previously collected 10,000 signatures as is required of potential candidates. The State Electoral Commission invalidated his candidacy as he had not fulfilled the requirement that all presidential candidates live in the country for 15 consecutive years prior to nomination.

Boškoski as a candidate took part in the 2009 Macedonian presidential election and ended up fourth out of seven candidates with 145,638 votes (14.87% out of total votes).

In May 2009, Boškoski formed a political party with the name "United for Macedonia".

Illegal party funding

On 6 June 2011, one day after the 2011 election, on which United for Macedonia did not win any parliamentary seats, Boškoski was arrested by the police on suspicions of using illegal funding for his party's campaign. During the arrest, the police alleged that he had 100.000 Euro in cash, received in an illegal way, intended for financing of the campaign. According to the police, Boškoski had been followed by them on a court order for two months prior to the arrest, and had received additional 30.000 Euro of illegal funds during this period.

The next day, Boškoski was brought in front of a judge, who ordered his 30-day detention, pending trial on charges for abuse of office and illegal financing of a political party. Supporters of Boškoski deny the charges and claimed that his arrest was politically motivated by his political opponents.

Following a trial, on 29 November 2011 he was convicted of illegal campaign funding and abuse of office, and sentenced to 7 years in prison. The main opposition party and his supporters accused the government of interfering in the judicial process, and the police of framing Boškoski and putting him in jail because of his fierce criticism of the government in his campaign speeches. Boškoski's family also stated that the verdict was politically motivated and that they will bring the case to the international courts.

References

External links
Official website
Website dedicated to Ljube Boškoski
News-style program about the killings at Ansar Burney Trust (Video)

1960 births
Living people
People from Brvenica Municipality
People indicted by the International Criminal Tribunal for the former Yugoslavia
People acquitted by the International Criminal Tribunal for the former Yugoslavia
Government ministers of North Macedonia
VMRO-DPMNE politicians
Ss. Cyril and Methodius University of Skopje alumni
Macedonian nationalists
Macedonian criminals